Peace Ewomazino Efih (born 5 August 2000) is a Nigerian footballer who plays as a midfielder for Israeli Ligat Nashim club FC Kiryat Gat and the Nigeria women's national team. She previously played for Edo Queens and Rivers Angels in the Nigeria Women Premier League. At the 2018 WAFU Zone B Women's Cup, Efih scored the lone goal in Nigeria's first game at the tournament.

In July 2019, Efih signed for Sporting de Huelva on a year deal.

References

External links 
 

2000 births
Living people
Nigerian women's footballers
Women's association football midfielders
Rivers Angels F.C. players
Sporting de Huelva players
Zaragoza CFF players
F.C. Kiryat Gat (women) players
Primera División (women) players
Segunda Federación (women) players
Ligat Nashim players
Nigerian expatriate women's footballers
Nigerian expatriate sportspeople in Spain
Expatriate women's footballers in Spain
Nigerian expatriate sportspeople in Israel
Expatriate women's footballers in Israel
Nigeria women's international footballers